At risk mental state is the clinical presentation of those considered at risk of developing psychosis or schizophrenia. Such states were formerly considered treated as prodromes, emerging symptoms of psychosis, but this view is no longer prevalent as a prodromal period can not be confirmed unless the emergence of the condition has occurred.

The original specialist service for those with subclinical symptoms of psychosis was The Pace Clinic in Melbourne, Australia. Other clinics have since developed around the world.

There has been some considerable development of how the concept can be applied clinically.

Assessed during the structured interview developed by PACE.

See also
 Early psychosis
 Schizophreniform disorder
 Schizothymia
 Schizotypal personality disorder

References 

Symptoms
Early psychosis